Simply is an album by jazz singer Blossom Dearie that was released in 1982 on her label, Daffodil Records. Musicians on the album include Bob Dorough, Jay Berliner and Grady Tate.

Track listing 
Side A
 "I Never Say Goodbye" (Jack Segal – Blossom Dearie)
 "I Know My Lines" (Jack Segal – Blossom Dearie)
 "Sweet Kentucky Home" (David Frishberg)
 "Bobby and Me" (Jack Segal – Blossom Dearie)
 "Answering Machine" (Rupert Holmes)

Side B
 "Bye-Bye Country Boy" (Jack Segal – Blossom Dearie)
 "I Told You So" (Duncan Lamont)
 "I Have the Feeling I've Been Here Before" (Alan and Marilyn Bergman – Roger Kellaway)
 "Just the Way You Are" (Billy Joel)
 "Bring All Your Love Along" (Jack Segal – Blossom Dearie)

Personnel 
 Blossom Dearie – piano, vocals
 Bob Dorough – vocals
 Mike Renzi – keyboards
 Jay Berliner – guitar
 Jay Leonhart – bass
 Grady Tate – drums

References

1982 albums
Blossom Dearie albums